The men's Laser competition at the 2018 Asian Games was held from 24 to 31 August 2018. It was also the qualification tournament for Laser Class at the 2020 Summer Olympics.

Schedule
All times are Western Indonesia Time (UTC+07:00)

Results
Legend
DPI — Discretionary penalty imposed
DSQ — Disqualification
RET — Retired

References

External links
Official website

Men's Laser